The Kent Dairy Round Barn near Red Lodge, Montana is a round barn that was built during 1939-1941 and is believed to be one of the last round dairy barns built in the United States.  It has an adjoining rectangular milkhouse.  The barn was built under supervision of master barn builder, Emery McNamee, by Ephraim Kent and sons Armas, Harry, James, Leo, and Waino.

It was listed on the National Register of Historic Places in 1995.  The listing included two contributing buildings and one other contributing site.

References

Infrastructure completed in 1941
Round barns in Montana
Barns on the National Register of Historic Places in Montana
National Register of Historic Places in Carbon County, Montana
1941 establishments in Montana
Dairy buildings in the United States